The Constitution of the German Confederation or German Federal Act was the constitution enacted the day before  the Congress of Vienna's Final Act, which established the German Confederation of 39 states, created from the previous 360 states of the Holy Roman Empire, under the presidency of the Emperor of Austria. It came into effect on 8 June 1815.

External links
 Text of the Constitution 

Constitutions of Germany
1815 in politics
1815 in Europe
1815 in law
German Confederation
1815 documents
Congress of Vienna